Rudolph "Rudi" Hasse (birth unknown) is a South African rugby union and professional rugby league footballer who played in the 1960s.

Playing career
Rudi Hasse transferred from rugby union to rugby league with Bradford Northern, he was transferred from Bradford Northern to Wakefield Trinity, he made his début for Wakefield Trinity during April 1964, and he played his last match for Wakefield Trinity during the 1964–65 season.

References

External links
Search for "Rudolph" at rugbyleagueproject.org
Search for "Rudi" at rugbyleagueproject.org
Search for "Rudy" at rugbyleagueproject.org
Search for "Hasse" at rugbyleagueproject.org
Search for "Hass" at rugbyleagueproject.org
[http://www.rlhp.co.uk/imagedetail.asp?id=790 Image 
Between the Springbok and Ikhamanga – The Untold Story of South Africa's Black Rugby Exiles
South Africans who have played for Wakefield Trinity

Living people
Bradford Bulls players
Expatriate rugby league players in England
Place of birth missing (living people)
Rugby league second-rows
South African expatriate rugby league players
South African expatriate sportspeople in England
South African rugby league players
South African rugby union players
Wakefield Trinity players
Western Province (rugby union) players
1935 births